Nel is both a South African (Afrikaans) surname and a Dutch feminine given name. Notable people with the name include:

Surname
André Nel (born 1977), South African cricketer
Andries Nel (born 1965), South African deputy minister
Anton Nel (born 1961), American classical pianist
Christof Nel (born 1944), German theatre and opera director
Corne Nel, South African rugby player
Dewald Nel (born 1980), South African-born Scottish cricketer
Elizabeth Nel (1917–2007), English personal secretary to Winston Churchill during the Second World War
Fred Nel, South African politician
Gerrie Nel (born 1961), South African advocate and prosecutor
Gert Cornelius Nel (1885–1950), South African botanist
Gert Vlok Nel (born 1963), South African poet
Grant Nel, Australian diver
Jack Nel (born 1928), South African cricketer
Jacques Nel (born 1993), South African rugby player
Japie Nel (born 1982), South African rugby player
Jean-Pierre Nel, South African rugby player
JP Nel (born 1981), South African rugby player
Justin Nel (born 1987), Namibian rugby player
Krubert Nel (born c.1960), South African Army officer
Michiel Daniel Christiaan De Wet Nel (born 1901), South African Politician
Philip Nel (born 1969), American scholar of children's literature and professor of English
Philip J. Nel (1902–1984), South African rugby union player
Riana Nel (born 1982), Namibian singer and songwriter
Ricus Nel (born 1979), Afrikaans musician, singer and songwriter
Ruhan Nel (born 1991), South African rugby union player
Susan Nel (born 1956), South African lawn bowler
Vita Nel, South African beach volleyball player
Wenda Nel (born 1988),  South African hurdler
W. P. Nel (born 1986), South African-born Scottish rugby player

Given name

Feminine name
The Dutch feminine name is a short form of Petronella or Cornelia. People with the name include:
Nel Benschop (1918–2005), Dutch poet
Nel Bos (1947), Dutch swimmer
Nel Büch (1931–2013), Dutch sprinter
Nel Burgerhof (1908–1991), Dutch gymnast
Nel de Crits (born 1991), Belgian racing cyclist
Nel Erasmus (born 1928), South African abstract artist
Nel Fritz (born 1937), Dutch gymnast
Nel Garritsen (1933–2014), Dutch swimmer
Nel Ginjaar-Maas (1931–2012), Dutch State Secretary of Education
Nel Karelse (1926–2015), Dutch sprinter and long-jumper
Nel Law (1914–1990), Australian artist, poet and diarist
Nel Noddings (born 1929), American feminist, educationalist, and philosopher
Nel van Randwijk (1905–1978), Dutch gymnast
Nel Roos-Lodder (1914–1996), Dutch discus thrower
Nel van Vliet (1926–2006), Dutch swimmer
Nel Wambach (born 1938), Dutch gymnast
Nel Zwier (1936–2001), Dutch high jumper
Fictional character
Nel Rawlison, a main character in Henryk Sienkiewicz's novel In Desert and Wilderness

Masculine name
Often a short form of Nelson
Nel Martín (born 1980), Spanish vert skater
Nel Oduber (born 1947), Prime Minister of Aruba
Nel Tarleton (1906–1956), English featherweight boxer
Nel Ust Wyclef Jean (born 1969), Haitian musician better known as Wyclef Jean

See also

Nela (name)
Nell (disambiguation)

Dutch feminine given names
Afrikaans-language surnames